Marina Tomić (born 30 April 1983 in Celje) is a Slovenian athlete who specialises in the 100 metres hurdles.

Tomić represented Slovenia at the 2012 Summer Olympics where she finished in joint 21st place in the 100 m hurdles.

Achievements

References

External links 
 

1983 births
Living people
Sportspeople from Celje
Slovenian female hurdlers
Olympic athletes of Slovenia
Athletes (track and field) at the 2012 Summer Olympics
Mediterranean Games bronze medalists for Slovenia
Athletes (track and field) at the 2013 Mediterranean Games
Mediterranean Games medalists in athletics
Competitors at the 2003 Summer Universiade
Competitors at the 2007 Summer Universiade
Competitors at the 2009 Summer Universiade